La Chapelle-Saint-Florent is a former commune in the Maine-et-Loire department of western France. On 15 December 2015, it was merged into the new commune Mauges-sur-Loire.

Geography
The commune is traversed by the Èvre river.

See also
Communes of the Maine-et-Loire department

References

Chapellesaintflorent